Duru Shah is a Mumbai-based gynaecologist and academic. She is the founder and president of PCOS Society and a promoter of women's health and adolescents health in India. Shah is also the guide for postgraduate students in Obs. Gyn. for Doctorate of Medicine at Mumbai University. She is the scientific director of Gynaecworld and the Gynaecworld Assisted Fertility Center, Mumbai. Dr Duru Shah has authored five books and published various research articles. Shah is also the promoter of Metropolis Healthcare Ltd. She is a member of the editorial board of The Obstetrician & Gynecologist (TOG), Climacteric and the Journal of Human Reproductive Sciences. In 2000, Dr Shah initiated adolescent reproductive and sexual health project called "Growing Up". Dr. Shah is also the founding member and trustee of the Women’s Empowerment Foundation, a non-profit organization established in 2014 that focuses on gender violence and women’s rights.

Publications (books) 
 Practical Infertility Management (2002)  
 The Polycystic Ovary Syndrome (2004) 
 Fetal Attraction (2005)  
 Clinical Progress in Obstetrics & Gynecology (2009) 
 Pregnancy and You Plan, Prepare Push! (2016)

Positions held 
 Past President of the Indian Society of Assisted Reproduction (ISAR) - 2017-2018
 Past President of the Indian Menopause Society
 Chair of the Special Interest Group (SIG) on Reproductive Endocrinology at ASPIRE
 Chair of the Indian Special Interest Group (ISIG) at ASRM
 Chair of the Indian College of Obstetricians & Gynecologists (ICOG)
 Technical expert to the Ministry of Health, Government of India and WHO
 President of the Federation of Obstetric and Gynaecological Societies of India (FOGSI),
 President Mumbai Obstetric and Gynaecological Society (MOGS)

Awards and recognition 
 Honorary Fellowship of the Royal College of Obstetricians & Gynecology– November 2008.
 First Indian to receive international FIGO Distinguished Merit Award (2012)

Philanthropy 
She initiated project Kishori  -  a program for urban slum Dharavi. It focussed on community-based adolescent empowerment.

References 

Medical doctors from Mumbai
Academic staff of the University of Mumbai
Indian women gynaecologists
Year of birth missing (living people)
Living people